The 1991–92 Divizia A was the seventy-fourth season of Divizia A, the top-level football league of Romania.

Teams

League table
An additional place for UEFA Cup was added following the UN ban to Yugoslavia.

Positions by round

Results

Top goalscorers

Champion squad

See also
1991–92 Divizia B

References

Liga I seasons
Romania
1991–92 in Romanian football